June 4 - Eastern Orthodox Church calendar - June 6

All fixed commemorations below celebrated on June 18 by Orthodox Churches on the Old Calendar.

For June 5th, Orthodox Churches on the Old Calendar commemorate the Saints listed on May 23.

Saints
 The Holy 10 Martyrs of Egypt (c. 305-311):
 Marcian, Nicander, Hyperechius, Apollonius, Leonides (father of Origen), Arius, Gorgias, Selenia, Irene, and Pambo.
 Martyr Conon of Rome, drowned at sea.
 Martyr Christopher of Rome, by the sword.
 Martyr Nonnus.
 Hieromartyr Dorotheus of Tyre, Bishop of Tyre (362)
 Hieromartyr Theodore of Tyre, Bishop of Tyre (c. 361-363)
 Saint Dorotheus of Thebes (c. 395)
 Venerable Anubius, confessor and anchorite, of Scetis (4th century)
 Venerable Theodore the Wonderworker, hermit of the Jordan (6th century)
 Venerable Abba Dorotheus of Gaza (c. 620)
 Saint Plutarch, Archbishop of Cyprus (620)

Pre-Schism Western saints
 Martyrs Florentius, Julian, Cyriacus, Marcellinus and Faustinus, beheaded in Perugia in central Italy under Decius (250)
 Saint Illidius (Allyre), Bishop of Clermont in Gaul (385)
 Saint Tudno, patron saint of Llandudno (6th century)
 Hieromartyr Boniface (Wynfrith), Archbishop of Mainz and Enlightener of Germany, and those martyred with him (754):
 St. Adalar (Adalher, de), Bishop of Erfurt (755);
 Hieromartyr Eoban, Chorbishop, who preached with Sts Willibrord and Boniface and shared in the latter's martyrdom in Dokkum (754)
 Hieromartyrs Wintrung, Walter and Adelhere, priests; and, Hamund, Scirebald and Bosa, deacons, martyred with St Boniface (754)
 Monk-martyrs Waccar, Gundekar, Elleher and Hathawulf, martyred with St Boniface in Germany (754)
 Monk-martyr Felix of Fritzlar, a monk at Fritzlar in Germany, probably at the hands of heathen (790)
 Martyr Sanctius (Sancho, Sancius), soldier, at Córdoba (851)
 Saint Meinwerk, Bishop of Paderborn (1036)

Post-Schism Orthodox saints
 Saint Dorotheus the Younger, abbot, at Chiliokama on the Black Sea (11th century)
 Saint Constantine, Metropolitan of Kiev and all Rus' (1159)
 Saint Theodore Yaroslavich of Novgorod, brother of St. Alexander Nevsky (1233)
 Venerable Peter of Koriša, Serbia, monk (1275)  (see also: June 18 )
 Saints Agapius and Nicodemus, stewards of Vatopedi (14th century)
 New Martyr Mark of Smyrna, on Chios (1801)
 Schema-Igumen Ioann (Alexeev) of New Valamo Monastery (1958)

New martyrs and confessors
 New Hieromartyr Michael Votyakov, Priest (1931)
 New Hieromartyr Nicholas Ryurikov, Priest (1943)

Other commemorations
 Icon of the Mother of God of Igor (1147)
 Translation to Chernigov of the relics of the Blessed Igor-George, tonsured Gabriel, great prince of Chernigov and Kiev (1150)
 Uncovering of the relics (1599) of Venerables Jonah (1561) and Bassian, monks, of Pertoma (ru) and Solovki (1599)

Icon gallery

Notes

References

Sources
 June 5/18. Orthodox Calendar (PRAVOSLAVIE.RU).
 June 18 / June 5. HOLY TRINITY RUSSIAN ORTHODOX CHURCH (A parish of the Patriarchate of Moscow).
 June 5. OCA - The Lives of the Saints.
 The Autonomous Orthodox Metropolia of Western Europe and the Americas (ROCOR). St. Hilarion Calendar of Saints for the year of our Lord 2004. St. Hilarion Press (Austin, TX). p. 41.
 The Fifth Day of the Month of June. Orthodoxy in China.
 June 5. Latin Saints of the Orthodox Patriarchate of Rome.
 The Roman Martyrology. Transl. by the Archbishop of Baltimore. Last Edition, According to the Copy Printed at Rome in 1914. Revised Edition, with the Imprimatur of His Eminence Cardinal Gibbons. Baltimore: John Murphy Company, 1916. pp. 164–165.
 Rev. Richard Stanton. A Menology of England and Wales, or, Brief Memorials of the Ancient British and English Saints Arranged According to the Calendar, Together with the Martyrs of the 16th and 17th Centuries. London: Burns & Oates, 1892. pp. 255–258.
Greek Sources
 Great Synaxaristes:  5 ΙΟΥΝΙΟΥ. ΜΕΓΑΣ ΣΥΝΑΞΑΡΙΣΤΗΣ.
  Συναξαριστής. 5 Ιουνίου. ECCLESIA.GR. (H ΕΚΚΛΗΣΙΑ ΤΗΣ ΕΛΛΑΔΟΣ). 
  05/06/2017. Ορθόδοξος Συναξαριστής. 
Russian Sources
  18 июня (5 июня). Православная Энциклопедия под редакцией Патриарха Московского и всея Руси Кирилла (электронная версия). (Orthodox Encyclopedia - Pravenc.ru).
  5 июня по старому стилю / 18 июня по новому стилю. Русская Православная Церковь - Православный церковный календарь на 2016 год.
  5 июня (ст.ст.) 18 июня 2014 (нов. ст.). Русская Православная Церковь Отдел внешних церковных связей. (DECR).

June in the Eastern Orthodox calendar